J. B. Lenoir (March 5, 1929 – April 29, 1967) was an American blues guitarist and singer-songwriter, active in the Chicago blues scene in the 1950s and 1960s.

Life and career
Lenoir was born in Monticello, Mississippi. His full given name was simply "J. B."; the letters were not initials. Lenoir's guitar-playing father introduced him to the music of Blind Lemon Jefferson, which became a major influence. During the early 1940s, Lenoir worked with the blues artists Sonny Boy Williamson II and Elmore James in New Orleans. He was later influenced by Arthur Crudup and Lightnin' Hopkins.

In 1949, he moved to Chicago, where Big Bill Broonzy helped introduce him to the blues community. He began to perform at local nightclubs, with musicians such as Memphis Minnie, Big Maceo Merriweather, and Muddy Waters, and became an important part of the city's blues scene. He began recording in 1951 for J.O.B. Records and Chess Records. His recording of "Korea Blues" was licensed to and released by Chess, as having been performed by J. B. and his Bayou Boys. His band included the pianist Sunnyland Slim, the guitarist Leroy Foster, and the drummer Alfred Wallace.

During the 1950s Lenoir recorded for various record labels in the Chicago area, including J.O.B., Chess, Parrot, and Checker. His more successful songs included "Let's Roll," "The Mojo" (featuring saxophonist J. T. Brown) and the controversial "Eisenhower Blues," which Parrot Records forced him to re-record as "Tax Paying Blues."

Lenoir was known in the 1950s for his showmanship, particularly his zebra-patterned costumes, and his high-pitched vocals. He became an influential electric guitarist and songwriter, and his penchant for social commentary distinguished him from many other bluesmen of the time. His most commercially successful and enduring release was "Mamma Talk to Your Daughter," recorded for Parrot in 1954, which reached number 11 on the Billboard R&B chart and was later recorded by many other blues and rock musicians. In the later 1950s, recording for Checker, he wrote several more blues standards, including "Don't Dog Your Woman" and "Don't Touch My Head!!!" (1956). 

In 1963, he recorded for USA Records as J. B. Lenoir and his African Hunch Rhythm, having developed an interest in African percussion. He was rediscovered by Willie Dixon, who recorded him playing acoustic guitar, with the drummer Fred Below, on the albums Alabama Blues and Down in Mississippi (inspired by the Civil Rights Movement and Free Speech Movement). Lenoir toured Europe and performed in 1965 with the American Folk Blues Festival in the United Kingdom.

Lenoir's work had overtly political content relating to racism and the Korean and Vietnam wars.

Death and legacy
Lenoir died on April 29, 1967, in Urbana, Illinois, at the age 38, of injuries he had suffered in a car crash three weeks earlier.

The 2003 documentary film The Soul of a Man, directed by Wim Wenders as the second installment of Martin Scorsese's series The Blues, explored Lenoir's career, together with those of Skip James and Blind Willie Johnson. In 2011, Lenoir was inducted into the Blues Hall of Fame.

Discography

Albums
Alabama Blues (CBS, 1966)
J. B. Lenoir (Polydor/Crusade, 1970) (posthumous, featuring interview by John Mayall with Ella Louise Lenoir)

Singles
"My Baby Told Me" / "Korea Blues" (Chess 78, 1950)
"Deep in Debt Blues" / "Carrie Lee" (Chess 78, 1950)
"Let's Roll" / "People Are Meddling (In Our Affairs)" (J.O.B. 78, 1952)
"The Mountain" / "How Much More" (J.O.B., 1952)
"The Mojo" / "How Can I Leave" (J.O.B., 1953)
"I'll Die Tryin'" / "I Want My Baby" (J.O.B., 1953)
"Play A Little While" / "Louise" (J.O.B., 1954)
"I'm In Korea" / "Eisenhower Blues" (later pressings had "Tax Paying Blues" as the B-side) (Parrot, 1954)
"Mamma Talk To Your Daughter" / "Man Watch Your Woman" (Parrot, 1954)
"Mama Your Daughter Is Going To Miss Me" / "What Have I Done" (Parrot, 1955)
"Fine Girls" / "I Lost My Baby" (Parrot, 1955)
"Let Me Die With The One I Love" / "If I Give My Love To You?" (Checker, 1956)
"Don't Touch My Head!!!" / "I've Been Down So Long" (Checker, 1957)
"What About Your Daughter?" / "Five Years" (Checker, 1957)
"Daddy Talk To Your Son" / "She Don't Know" (Checker, 1958)
"Back Door" / "Lou Ella" (Shad, 1959)
"Oh Baby" / "Do What I Say" (Vee-Jay, 1960)
"I Sing Um The Way I Feel" / "I Feel So Good" (USA, 1963)
"Mojo Boogie" / "I Don't Care What Nobody Say" (Blue Horizon, 1966)

Compilation albums
Alabama Blues: Rare and Intimate Recordings
Chess Masters (Chess double LP, 1984)
The Parrot Sessions, 1954–55 (Relic LP, 1989)

References

External links
J. B. Lenoir filmed performances

1929 births
1967 deaths
Chicago blues musicians
Electric blues musicians
American blues guitarists
American male guitarists
American blues harmonica players
American blues singers
Blues musicians from Mississippi
People from Monticello, Mississippi
Checker Records artists
Political music artists
20th-century American singers
20th-century American guitarists
Guitarists from Illinois
Guitarists from Mississippi
20th-century American male musicians
USA Records artists
Road incident deaths in Illinois
Deaths from bleeding